Carolyn Janice Cherry (born September 1, 1942), better known by the pen name C. J. Cherryh, is an American writer of speculative fiction. She has written more than 80 books since the mid-1970s, including the Hugo Award-winning novels Downbelow Station (1981) and Cyteen (1988), both set in her Alliance–Union universe, and her Foreigner series. She is known for worldbuilding, depicting fictional realms with great realism supported by vast research in history, language, psychology, and archeology.

Cherryh (pronounced "Cherry") appended a silent "h" to her real name because her first editor, Donald A. Wollheim, felt that "Cherry" sounded too much like a romance writer. She used only her initials, C. J., to disguise that she was female at a time when the majority of science fiction authors were male.

The author has an asteroid, 77185 Cherryh, named after her. Referring to this honor, the asteroid's discoverers wrote of Cherryh: "She has challenged us to be worthy of the stars by imagining how mankind might grow to live among them."

Biography

Cherryh was born in 1942 in St. Louis, Missouri and raised primarily in Lawton, Oklahoma. She began writing stories at the age of ten when she became frustrated with the cancellation of her favorite TV show, Flash Gordon. In 1964, she received a Bachelor of Arts degree in Latin from the University of Oklahoma (Phi Beta Kappa), with academic specializations in archaeology, mythology, and the history of engineering. In 1965, she received a Master of Arts degree in classics from Johns Hopkins University in Baltimore, Maryland, where she was a Woodrow Wilson fellow.

After graduation, Cherryh taught Latin, Ancient Greek, the classics, and ancient history at John Marshall High School in the Oklahoma City public school system. While her job was teaching Latin, her passion was the history, religion, and culture of Rome and Ancient Greece.  During the summers, she would conduct student tours of the ancient ruins in England, France, Spain, and Italy.  In her spare time, she would write, using the mythology of Rome and Greece as plots for her stories of the future.  Cherryh did not follow the professional path typical of science fiction writers at the time, which was to first publish short stories in science fiction and fantasy magazines and then progress to novels; she did not consider writing short stories until she had had several novels published.

Cherryh wrote novels in her spare time away from teaching and submitted these manuscripts directly for publication. Initially, she met with little success; various publishers lost manuscripts she had submitted. She was thus forced to retype them from her own carbon copies, time-consuming but cheaper than paying for photocopying. (Using carbon paper to make at least one copy of a manuscript was standard practice until the advent of the personal computer.)

Cherryh's breakthrough came in 1975 when Donald A. Wollheim purchased the two manuscripts she had submitted to DAW Books, Gate of Ivrel and Brothers of Earth. About the former, Cherryh stated in an interview on Amazing Stories:

It was the first time a book really found an ending and really worked, because I had made contact with Don Wollheim at DAW, found him interested, and was able to write for a specific editor whose body of work and type of story I knew. It was a good match. It was a set of characters I'd invented when I was, oh, about thirteen. So it was an old favorite of my untold stories, and ended up being the first in print.

The two novels were published in 1976, Gate of Ivrel preceding Brothers of Earth by several months (although she had completed and submitted Brothers of Earth first). The books won her immediate recognition and the John W. Campbell Award for Best New Writer in 1977.

Although not all of her works have been published by DAW Books, during this early period Cherryh developed a strong relationship with the Wollheim family and their publishing company, frequently travelling to New York City and staying with the Wollheims in their Queens family home. Other companies who have published her novels include Baen Books, HarperCollins, Warner Books, and Random House (under its Del Rey Books imprint). She published six additional novels in the late 1970s.

In 1979, her short story "Cassandra" won the Best Short Story Hugo, and she quit teaching to write full-time. She has since won the Hugo Award for Best Novel twice, first for Downbelow Station in 1982 and then again for Cyteen in 1989.

In addition to developing her own fictional universes, Cherryh has contributed to several shared world anthologies, including Thieves' World, Heroes in Hell, Elfquest, Witch World, Magic in Ithkar, and the Merovingen Nights series, which she edited. Her writing has encompassed a variety of science fiction and fantasy subgenres and includes a few short works of non-fiction. Her books have been translated into Czech, Dutch, French, German, Hebrew, Hungarian, Italian, Japanese, Latvian, Lithuanian, Polish, Portuguese, Romanian, Russian, Slovak, Spanish, and Swedish. She has also translated several published works of fiction from French into English.

She now lives near Spokane, Washington with her wife, the science fiction/fantasy author and artist Jane Fancher. She enjoys skating and travelling and regularly makes appearances at science fiction conventions.

Her brother David A. Cherry is a science fiction and fantasy artist.

Writing style
Cherryh uses a writing technique she has variously labeled "very tight limited third person", "intense third person", and "intense internal" voice. In this approach, the only things the writer narrates are those that the viewpoint character specifically notices or thinks about. The narration may not mention important features of the environment or situation with which the character is already familiar, even though these things might be of interest to the reader, because the character does not think about them owing to their familiarity.

World building
Cherryh's works depict fictional worlds with great realism supported by her strong background in languages, history, archaeology, and psychology. In her introduction to Cherryh's first book, Andre Norton compared the effect of the work to Tolkien's: "Never since reading The Lord of the Rings have I been so caught up in any tale as I have been in Gate of Ivrel." Another reviewer commented, "Her blend of science and folklore gives the novels an intellectual depth comparable to Tolkien or Gene Wolfe." Cherryh creates believable alien cultures, species, and perspectives, causing the reader to reconsider basic assumptions about human nature. Her worlds have been praised as complex and realistic because she presents them through implication rather than explication. She describes the difficulties of translating/expressing concepts between differing languages. This is best demonstrated in both the Chanur and Foreigner series.

She has described the process she uses to create alien societies for her fiction as being akin to asking a series of questions, and letting the answers to these questions dictate various parameters of the alien culture. In her view, "culture is how biology responds to its environment and makes its living conditions better." Some of the issues she considers critical to take into account in detailing an intelligent alien race are:
 The physical environment in which the species lives
 The location and nature of the race's dwellings, including the spatial relationships between those dwellings
 The species' diet, method(s) of obtaining and consuming food, and cultural practices regarding the preparation of meals and eating (if any)
 Processes which the aliens use to share knowledge
 Customs and ideas regarding death, dying, the treatment of the race's dead, and the afterlife (if any)
 Metaphysical issues related to self-definition and the aliens' concept of the fictional universe they inhabit

Major themes

Her protagonists often attempt to uphold existing social institutions and norms in the service of the greater good while the antagonists often attempt to exploit, subvert or radically alter the predominant social order for selfish gain. She uses the theme of the outsider finding his (or her) place in society and how individuals interact with The Other. A number of Cherryh's novels focus on military and political themes. One underlying theme of her work is an exploration of gender roles. Her characters reveal both strengths and weaknesses regardless of their gender, although her female protagonists are portrayed as especially capable and determined, and many of her male characters are portrayed as damaged, abused, or otherwise vulnerable.

Works

Her career began with publication of her first books in 1976, Gate of Ivrel and Brothers of Earth. Since that time, she has published over 80 novels, short-story compilations, with continuing production as her blog attests.  Ms. Cherryh has received the Hugo, Locus, and Prometheus Awards for some of her novels. Her novels are divided into various spheres, focusing mostly around the Alliance–Union universe, The Chanur novels, the Foreigner series, and her fantasy novels.

Scholarship
 The Cherryh Odyssey (2004,), edited by Edward Carmien, compiles a dozen essays by academic and professional voices discussing the literary life and career of Cherryh. A bibliography is included.
The Jack Williamson Science Fiction Library at Eastern New Mexico University contains a collection of Cherryh's manuscripts and notes for scholarly research.
 Military Command in Women's Science Fiction: C.J. Cherryh's Signy Mallory (2000), Part 1, Part 2 by Camille Bacon-Smith.
 "Animal Transference: A 'Mole-like Progression' in C.J. Cherry" (2011) by Lynn Turner, in Mosaic: a journal for the interdisciplinary study of literature, 44.3, pp. 163–175.

Awards and honors

Cherryh has also received the following honors:

John W. Campbell Award for Best New Writer – 1977
 NESFA Edward E. Smith Memorial Award (The Skylark) – 1988 
 Guest of Honor at BucConeer, the 1998 World Science Fiction Convention in Baltimore
Asteroid 77185 Cherryh, discovered March 20, 2001 and named in her honor.
Oklahoma Book Awards – Arrell Gibson Lifetime Achievement Award 2005
 Guest of Honor at FenCon IX in Dallas/Fort Worth on September 21–23, 2012.
SFWA Damon Knight Memorial Grand Master Award – 2016
 Prometheus Award for Best Novel 2020 —Alliance Rising
 Robert A. Heinlein Award – 2021

Organizations
Swordsmen and Sorcerers' Guild of America (SAGA) – member (granted for her "Morgaine" novels)
National Space Society – seat on the Board of Advisors
Endangered Language Fund – seat on the Board of Directors

References

External links

 , Blog and E-Book store run by Cherryh
 Bibliography with notes at SFFchronicles
 Interview at SFFWorld.com

 
Bibliography on SciFan

Bibliography, with book covers on FantasticFiction
Complete list of sci-fi award wins and nominations by novel
 Encyclopedia of Oklahoma History and Culture – Cherryh, Carolyn J.
 

 
1942 births
Living people
American science fiction writers
American fantasy writers
20th-century American novelists
21st-century American novelists
20th-century American women writers
21st-century American women writers
21st-century American short story writers
20th-century American short story writers
Hugo Award-winning writers
John W. Campbell Award for Best New Writer winners
Women science fiction and fantasy writers
Johns Hopkins University alumni
Novelists from Oklahoma
Writers from Spokane, Washington
University of Oklahoma alumni
Writers from St. Louis
People from Lawton, Oklahoma
American women short story writers
American LGBT novelists
LGBT people from Missouri
LGBT people from Oklahoma
American LGBT writers
American women novelists
SFWA Grand Masters
Novelists from Missouri
Novelists from Washington (state)
Pseudonymous women writers
20th-century pseudonymous writers
21st-century pseudonymous writers